Zinc finger protein 117 is a protein that in humans is encoded by the ZNF117 gene.

References

Further reading 

Human proteins